The Clackmannanshire Council election of 2017 was held on 4 May 2017, on the same day as the 31 other local authorities in Scotland. It was the third successive election to run under the STV electoral system and used the five wards created under the Local Governance (Scotland) Act 2004, with 18 councillors being elected.

Result

As Scottish Labour lost three seats and the Scottish National Party held all of theirs, the SNP became the largest party for the first time. The Scottish Conservatives unexpectedly won a seat in every ward, equalling their representation on the council with that of Labour.

During the first meeting of the new council on 18 May, however, an agreement was not reached on how to form an administration. In June 2017 a minority SNP administration was formed.

Note: "Votes" are the first preference votes. The net gain/loss and percentage changes relate to the result of the previous Scottish local elections on 3 May 2007. This may differ from other published sources showing gain/loss relative to seats held at dissolution of Scotland's councils.

Ward results

Clackmannanshire West
2012-2017 Change: 1 Lab loss and 1 Con gain

Clackmannanshire North
2012-2017 Change: 1 Independent loss and 1 Con gain

Clackmannanshire Central
2012-2017 Change: 1 Lab Loss; 1 Con Gain

Clackmannanshire South
2012-2017 Change: 1 Con Gain from Lab

Clackmannanshire East
2012-2017 Change: None

Changes since 2017
† Clackmannanshire North SNP Cllr Archie Drummond resigned his seat for personal reasons in late December 2017. A by-election was held on 1 March 2018 and the seat was retained by the party's Helen Lewis.
††Clackmannanshire South Cllr Chris Dixon on 7 March 2018 resigned from the Scottish Conservative Party on health reasons and now sits as an independent councillor.
††† Clackmannanshire Central SNP Cllr Phil Fairlie resigned his seat due to personal and professional reasons. A by-election was held on 18 March 2019. The seat was retained by Jane McTaggart of the SNP.
†††† Clackmannanshire East Conservative Cllr Bill Mason resigned his seat due to ill-health on 31 December 2019. This by-election was scheduled for 19 March but was deferred due to the COVID-19 pandemic in Scotland until 19 November 2020, when it was retained by Denis Coyne of the Scottish Conservative Party.

By-elections since 2017

References

2017
2017 Scottish local elections
21st century in Clackmannanshire